Baha (Nepal Bhasa:बहाः) is a type of courtyard found amongst Newar communities in Nepal. It is the most dominant type of courtyard in Newari Architecture. Baha is a term for Buddhist Monastery and derives its name from a Sanskrit word Bihara, meaning joy or enchantment and thus is a
place of religious bliss.

Characteristics
The characteristics of a Baha are:-
 A square or rectangular space bounded by buildings in all sides
 Surrounding buildings built on a raised platform called Falcha 
 Ground paved with brick or stone
 Generally centrally placed Chaitya
 Often presence of a well
 The building opposite to the main entrance generally houses a Guthi with idols of deities in the ground floor

Significance
The baha are generally constructed by a family and their descendants reside in it for generations. Hence, it is not just a unit of residence but also a unit of kinship. The Guthis of Newars have their basis on Baha. So, they play a great role in maintaining the norms of Newari society and lifestyle.

Some Baha
 Bhagwan Baha Thabahi (Thamel Tole)
 Makhan baha
 Sabal Baha
 Tacchya Baha
 Te Bahal
 Mu Baha
 Musya Baha
 Nagbahal
 Kwa Baha
 Itum baha
 Jana bahal (Machhendra baha)
 Om Baha
 Iku Baha
 Kunsha Baha (Kohsha Baha)
 Tukabaha
 Okubaha
 Na Baha

See also
 Buddhism in Nepal
 Kindo Baha
 List of Mahaviharas of Newar Buddhism
 List of monasteries in Nepal
 List of stupas in Nepal
 Newar Buddhism
 Newari Architecture
 Pranidhipurna Mahavihar

References

Bahals in Kathmandu